Racinaea kessleri is a plant species in the genus Racinaea. This species is endemic to Bolivia.

References

kessleri
Flora of Bolivia